Splendrillia intermaculata is a species of sea snail, a marine gastropod mollusk in the family Drilliidae.

Description
The shining, subpellucid, white shell shows four revolving series of brownish yellow dots between the ribs on the body whorl, and two on those of the spire. The ribs are slight and show no revolving striae.

Distribution
This marine species occurs off South Korea and Japan.

References

 Smith, Edgar A. "11. On a Collection of Mollusca from Japan." Proceedings of the Zoological Society of London. Vol. 47. No. 1. Blackwell Publishing Ltd, 1879.

External links
  Tucker, J.K. 2004 Catalog of recent and fossil turrids (Mollusca: Gastropoda). Zootaxa 682:1–1295.

intermaculata
Gastropods described in 1879